The NWA Florida Tag Team Championship is the primary tag team title in NWA Florida Underground Wrestling. It started out in 1968 as the main tag team title in Championship Wrestling from Florida and lasted until 1990 when it was abandoned. It was picked back up in 1997 by NWA Florida, where it was the primary tag team title until June 2005, when the company shut down. In August 2009, the title was picked up by Florida-based Pro Wrestling Fusion until 2011. NWA Florida Underground transformed its FUW Tag Team championship to the NWA Florida Tag Team championship in 2012

Title history

Championship Wrestling from Florida

Florida Championship Wrestling (Renamed FCW Tag Team Titles)

NWA Florida Major League Wrestling / NWA Florida

Pro Wrestling Fusion

Footnotes

References

Championship Wrestling from Florida championships
National Wrestling Alliance championships
Professional wrestling in Florida
State professional wrestling championships
Tag team wrestling championships
National Wrestling Alliance state wrestling championships